Eddie, Old Bob, Dick and Gary is the debut album by English punk rock band Tenpole Tudor. The title is a play on the phrase "any old Tom, Dick or Harry". A moderately successful seller, peaking at No. 44 on the UK Albums Chart, the album launched three singles: "Three Bells in a Row", "Wünderbar" and "Swords of a Thousand Men".  "Wünderbar" rose to No. 16 on the UK Singles Chart. "Swords of a Thousand Men" was the most successful of Tenpole Tudor's singles, reaching No. 6 and remaining on the charts for 12 weeks. The album was reissued on CD in 2007 on the See label.

Critical reception

Ira Robbins of Trouser Press lauded the band's single releases as "classy trash", noting that on the better tracks of the album, Tenpole Tudor's "good humor and rock energy are undeniably infectious". AllMusic, expressing surprise at the album's number of "flat-out excellent songs", judges the album as "a thrillingly primitive rock & roll record".

Track listing
Unless otherwise indicated, all songs by Eddie Tudorpole.

1981 LP (SEEZ 31)
"Swords of a Thousand Men"
"Go Wilder" (Dick Crippen, Bob Kingston, Tudorpole)
"I Wish"
"Header Now" (Gary Long, Tudorpole)
"There are Boys"
"Wünderbar"
"3 Bells in a Row" (Crippen, Kingston, Long, Tudorpole)
"Tell Me More"
"Judy Annual" (Long, Tudorpole)
"I Can't Sleep" (Kingston, Long, Tudorpole)
"Anticipation"
"What Else Can I Do"
"Confessions"

1991 CD reissue (REP 4220-WY)
"Swords of a Thousand Men" - 2:57
"Go Wilder" - 2:37
"I Wish" - 3:27
"Header Now" - 2:44
"There are Boys" - 4:35
"Wunderbar" - 3:00
"3 Bells in a Row" - 3:02
"Tell Me More" - 3:09
"Judy Annual" - 2:32
"I Can't Sleep" - 2:08
"What Else Can I Do" - 2:21
"Confessions" - 3:50
"Fashion" (Live at the Marquee) - 2:44
"Rock and Roll Music" (Live at the Marquee) - 2:10
"Love and Food" - 2:47
"Wunderbar" (Hit Single Version) - 3:00
"Tenpole 45" - 4:09
"There Are Boys" (Son of Stiff Version) - 4:35

1993 CD reissue (STIFFCD 06)
"Swords of a Thousand Men" - 2:57
"Go Wilder" - 2:37
"I Wish" - 3:27
"Header Now" - 2:44
"There are Boys" - 4:35
"Wunderbar" - 3:00
"3 Bells in a Row" - 3:02
"Tell Me More" - 3:09
"Judy Annual" - 2:32
"I Can't Sleep" - 2:08
"What Else Can I Do" - 2:21
"Confessions" - 3:50
"Love and Food" - 2:47
"There Are Boys" (Son Of Stiff Version) - 4:35
"Wunderbar" (Hit Single Version) - 3:00

"There are Boys" is mistitled as "There are the Boys" on both the 1991 and 1993 CD reissues.

2007 CD reissue (CDSEEZ 31)
"Swords of a Thousand Men" - 2:57
"Go Wilder" - 2:37
"I Wish" - 3:27
"Header Now" - 2:44
"There are Boys" - 4:35
"Wunderbar" - 3:00
"3 Bells in a Row" - 3:02
"Tell Me More" - 3:09
"Judy Annual" - 2:32
"I Can't Sleep" - 2:08
"Anticipation" - 2:01
"What Else Can I Do" - 2:21
"Confessions" - 3:50
"3 Bells in a Row" (Original Single Version) - 3:02
"Fashion" (Live at the Marquee) - 2:44
"Rock and Roll Music" (Live at the Marquee) - 2:10
"Love and Food" - 2:47
"Wunderbar" (Hit Single Version) - 3:00
"Tenpole 45" - 4:09
"There Are Boys" (Son Of Stiff Version) - 4:35
"Wunderbar" (Live from London University - Son of Stiff Tour) - 2:49
"Real Fun" (Live from London University - Son of Stiff Tour) - 2:43
"Go Wilder" (Live from London University - Son of Stiff Tour) - 2:18

Personnel
Tenpole Tudor
Dick Crippen (Richard Coppen) – bass, vocals, producer
Bob Kingston – guitar, vocals
Gary Long – percussion, drums, vocals
Eddie Tudorpole – guitar, saxophone, vocals
with:
Munch Universe – guitar, vocals
Technical
Bob Andrews – producer
Alan Winstanley – producer, engineer
Edwin Cross, Rik Walton, Simon Humphries - engineer
Chris Gabrin - photography

References

1981 debut albums
Tenpole Tudor albums
Stiff Records albums
Albums produced by Alan Winstanley